Theofanis Michaelas (born 26 November 1991) is a Cypriot middle-distance runner specialising in the 800 metres. He competed at the 2016 IAAF World Indoor Championships without advancing to the final.

His personal bests in the event are 1:49.68 outdoors (Huizingen 2015) and 1:49.51 indoors (Vienna 2015).

Competition record

References

External links
 

1991 births
Living people
Cypriot male middle-distance runners
Place of birth missing (living people)